Betafo ("many roofs) is a village and fokontany in  the district of Arivonimamo, in the region of Itasy, Madagascar.

Population
The village's inhabitants are said to be divided between descendants of nobles (andriana) and descendants of former slaves (olona mainty, literally "black people"). This aspect was the subject of a study by anthropologist David Graeber. His book, Lost People: Magic and the Legacy of Slavery in Madagascar, contains a detailed recounting of the village's oral traditions, full of stories of scandalous murders, magical battles, forbidden romances, and spiteful ancestors sending fires and hailstorms from their tombs.

References

Populated places in Itasy Region